In music theory, a natural (♮) is an accidental which cancels previous accidentals and represents the unaltered pitch of a note. A note is natural when it is neither flat nor sharp, double-flat , double-sharp , triple-flat or triple-sharp.
Natural notes are the notes A, B, C, D, E, F, and G represented by the white keys on the keyboard of a piano or organ. On a modern concert harp, the middle position of the seven pedals that alter the tuning of the strings gives the natural pitch for each string.

The scale of C major is sometimes regarded as the central, natural or basic major scale because all of its notes are natural notes, whereas every other major scale in the circle of fifths has at least one sharp or flat in it.

The notes F, C, E, B, and most notes inflected by double-flats and double-sharps correspond in pitch with natural notes; however, they are not regarded as natural notes but rather as enharmonic equivalents of them and are just as much chromatically inflected notes as most sharped and flatted notes that are represented by black notes on a keyboard.

Natural sign

In musical notation, a natural sign is an accidental sign used to cancel a flat or sharp from either a preceding note or the key signature. 

 
If a bar contains a double sharp or double flat accidental and the composer wishes to denote the same note with only a single sharp or flat, a natural sign traditionally precedes the (single) sharp or flat symbol. Naturals are assumed (by default) in key signatures and mentioned only in key signature changes.

The natural sign is derived from a square b used to denote B in medieval music (in contrast with the round b denoting B, which became the flat symbol). The Unicode character MUSIC NATURAL SIGN '♮' (U+266E) should display as a natural sign.

Double natural
In a case where one needs to cancel both flats or sharps of a double flat or double sharp, it is acceptable to write a single natural in modern notational practice. In older practice, two naturals can be written. Similarly, to cancel one flat or sharp from a double flat or sharp, the traditional convention is to use or  respectively, but the naturals are generally omitted in modern notational practice.

See also
Sharp (music)
Flat (music)

References

Musical notation
Pitch (music)